Anane may refer to:
 Merouane Anane (born 1990), Algerian footballer
 Mustapha Anane (1950–2010), Algerian international footballer
 Ricky Anane (born 1989), English footballer
 Richard W. Anane (born 1954), Ghanaian politician
  (born 1982), association footballer